The Oberstdorf International Mixed Doubles Cup is an annual mixed doubles curling tournament on the ISS Mixed Doubles World Curling Tour. It is held annually in early September at the Eissportzentrum Oberstdorf in Oberstdorf, Germany.

The purse for the event is €3,530 and its event categorization is 300 (highest calibre is 1000).

The event has been held since 2017.

Past champions

References

External links
Oberstdorf International Mixed Doubles Cup on Facebook

World Curling Tour events
Curling competitions in Germany
Sports competitions in Oberstdorf
Mixed doubles curling